Anthene rhodesiana, the Zimbabwe hairtail, is a butterfly in the family Lycaenidae. It is found in Zambia (the Copperbelt and the north-eastern part of the country) and north-eastern Zimbabwe. The habitat consists of deciduous woodland.

Adults have been recorded on wing in October, January and April.

References

Butterflies described in 1962
Anthene